The Fox River Classic Conference (often shortened to FRCC) is a high school athletic conference made up of ten full members, omne affiliate member and three football-only members in Northeastern Wisconsin, centering primarily around schools in Brown County, Manitowoc Lincoln High School, and the high schools of the Sheboygan Area School District, which maintained deep rivalries with the schools of the Green Bay Area School District in the forerunner Fox River Valley Conference. Conference schools are members of the Wisconsin Interscholastic Athletic Association.

Current members
Source:

Affiliated members

History
The FRCC was formed in 2007 when Ashwaubenon, Bay Port, De Pere and Pulaski left the Bay Conference and joined up with a stronger eight team Fox River Valley Conference. This was mainly done to level the playing field as the four Bay Schools were larger than most of the other Bay Schools. In 2011, Green Bay West requested to leave the FRCC and Green Bay East asked to leave the conference also. Both Green Bay East and West have stated they have not been able to compete in the FRCC. In January 2014, the WIAA approved a Realignment plan that would put Green Bay West and Green Bay East out of the FRCC and into the Bay Conference. This took effect for the 2015–16 school year. Another football-only realignment plan surfaced in 2018; West De Pere, Menasha, Green Bay East and Green Bay West would join the conference, which would be split into two divisions. The original plan called for Preble, Bay Port, Green Bay East, Green Bay Southwest, Pulaski, Ashwaubenon and Green Bay West in one and Sheboygan North, Sheboygan South, Manitowoc, De Pere, Menasha, West De Pere and Notre Dame in the other. A revised proposal came out in February 2019, this one including Preble, De Pere, Bay Port, Green Bay Southwest, Pulaski, West De Pere and Ashwaubenon in one and Sheboygan North, Sheboygan South, Manitowoc, Menasha, Notre Dame, Green Bay East and Green Bay West in the other. The plan was approved in April 2019 to take effect for the 2020–2021 school year.

Due to the COVID-19 pandemic, all full members of the FRCC besides Notre Dame joined with some teams from the Fox Valley Association and Wisconsin Valley Conference to form the 20-team Fox Valley Classic Conference football conference, which will play in spring 2021.

Divisions (2007-2015)

From 2007 to 2015, the Conference was divided into East and West divisions based on which side of the Fox River the school was on. For football, the divisions changed based on standings from the previous season. With Green Bay East and Green Bay West leaving at the end of 2015, the FRCC eliminated the divisions and teams played all the others in a season.

West Division

Ashwaubenon Jaguars

Bay Port Pirates

Green Bay Southwest Trojans

*Green Bay West Wildcats

Pulaski Red Raiders

Notre Dame Academy Tritons

East Division

De Pere Redbirds

*Green Bay East Red Devils

Green Bay Preble Hornets

Manitowoc Lincoln Ships

Sheboygan North Golden Raiders

Sheboygan South Redwings

left conference

References

External links
http://www.frccwi.com

Wisconsin high school sports conferences
High school sports conferences and leagues in the United States
2007 establishments in Wisconsin